Nancy Raffa is an American ballet master.

Early years 
Raffa was born in Brooklyn, New York City. She began training in ballet under the instruction of Madame Gabriella Darvash.

Dancing 
At 16 years old, Raffa became the youngest, and first American female to win the Gold Medal at Prix de Lausanne in 1980. That year, she joined Natalia Makarova and Company on Broadway. Makarova then brought her to American Ballet Theatre, where she became a member of the corps de ballet. Raffa danced many roles, including dancing in Tharp's Push Comes to Shove with Baryshnikov. She later joined as principal dancer with Ballet de Santiago, Ballet National Francaise, then Miami City Ballet.

Teaching and coaching 
After a serious injury, she retired from dancing and entered the field of teaching and coaching. In 1994, she joined the staff of the Miami City Ballet School. Raffa was twice awarded a special teacher's recognition from the National Foundation for he Advancement in the Arts. She was also awarded a grant from the United States Information Services to be a cultural ambassador for a company and school in Honduras. In addition, Raffa graduated magna cum laude in 2002 with a bachelor's degree in Psychology from St. Thomas University.

Raffa became head director of the American Ballet Theatre's National Summer Intensive program. In 2007, she was promoted to ballet mistress with the main company. Since then, she has worked closely with resident choreographer Alexei Ratmansky. She has aided him in his choreographic process for every ballet he has ever done with ABT. She sets many of his ABT works with companies around the globe.

References

Year of birth missing (living people)
Living people
Ballet mistresses
People from Brooklyn